Cricket at the 2011 Pacific Games in Nouméa, New Caledonia was held on August 29–September 2, 2011. The tournament format was changed from the 50 over cricket previously played to the shorter Twenty20 form of the game.

Results

Participating teams

Format
The four teams play a round robin before the best ranked team faces the second best team in the final.

Preliminary round

Knockout stage

Third place game

Final

References

Cricket at the 2011 Pacific Games

2011 Pacific Games
Pacific
2011
International cricket competitions in New Caledonia